In classical mechanics, the central-force problem is to determine the motion of a particle in a single central potential field. A central force is a force (possibly negative) that points from the particle directly towards a fixed point in space, the center, and whose magnitude only depends on the distance of the object to the center.  In a few important cases, the problem can be solved analytically, i.e., in terms of well-studied functions such as trigonometric functions.

The solution of this problem is important to classical mechanics, since many naturally occurring forces are central. Examples include gravity and electromagnetism as described by Newton's law of universal gravitation and Coulomb's law, respectively.  The problem is also important because some more complicated problems in classical physics (such as the two-body problem with forces along the line connecting the two bodies) can be reduced to a central-force problem.  Finally, the solution to the central-force problem often makes a good initial approximation of the true motion, as in calculating the motion of the planets in the Solar System.

Basics

The essence of the central-force problem is to solve for the position r of a particle moving under the influence of a central force F, either as a function of time t or as a function of the angle φ relative to the center of force and an arbitrary axis.

Definition of a central force

A conservative central force F has two defining properties. First, it must drive particles either directly towards or directly away from a fixed point in space, the center of force, which is often labeled O.  In other words, a central force must act along the line joining O with the present position of the particle.  Second, a conservative central force depends only on the distance r between O and the moving particle; it does not depend explicitly on time or other descriptors of position.

This two-fold definition may be expressed mathematically as follows.  The center of force O can be chosen as the origin of a coordinate system.  The vector r joining O to the present position of the particle is known as the position vector.  Therefore, a central force must have the mathematical form

where r is the vector magnitude |r| (the distance to the center of force) and r̂ = r/r is the corresponding unit vector.  According to Newton's second law of motion, the central force F generates a parallel acceleration a scaled by the mass m of the particle

For attractive forces, F(r) is negative, because it works to reduce the distance r to the center. Conversely, for repulsive forces, F(r) is positive.

Potential energy

If the central force is a conservative force, then the magnitude F(r) of a central force can always be expressed as the derivative of a time-independent potential energy function U(r)

Thus, the total energy of the particle—the sum of its kinetic energy and its potential energy U—is a constant; energy is said to be conserved.  To show this, it suffices that the work W done by the force depends only on initial and final positions, not on the path taken between them.

Equivalently, it suffices that the curl of the force field F is zero; using the formula for the curl in spherical coordinates,

because the partial derivatives are zero for a central force; the magnitude F does not depend on the angular spherical coordinates θ and φ.

Since the scalar potential V(r) depends only on the distance r to the origin, it has spherical symmetry.  In this respect, the central-force problem is analogous to the Schwarzschild geodesics in general relativity and to the quantum mechanical treatments of particles in potentials of spherical symmetry.

One-dimensional problem

If the initial velocity v of the particle is aligned with position vector r, then the motion remains forever on the line defined by r.  This follows because the force—and by Newton's second law, also the acceleration a—is also aligned with r.  To determine this motion, it suffices to solve the equation

One solution method is to use the conservation of total energy

Taking the reciprocal and integrating we get:

For the remainder of the article, it is assumed that the initial velocity v of the particle is not aligned with position vector r, i.e., that the angular momentum vector L = r × m v is not zero.

Uniform circular motion

Every central force can  produce uniform circular motion, provided that the initial radius r and speed v satisfy the equation for the centripetal force

If this equation is satisfied at the initial moments, it will be satisfied at all later times; the particle will continue to move in a circle of radius r at speed v forever.

Relation to the classical two-body problem

The central-force problem concerns an ideal situation (a "one-body problem") in which a single particle is attracted or repelled from an immovable point O, the center of force.  However, physical forces are generally between two bodies; and by Newton's third law, if the first body applies a force on the second, the second body applies an equal and opposite force on the first.  Therefore, both bodies are accelerated if a force is present between them; there is no perfectly immovable center of force.  However, if one body is overwhelmingly more massive than the other, its acceleration relative to the other may be neglected; the center of the more massive body may be treated as approximately fixed. For example, the Sun is overwhelmingly more massive than the planet Mercury; hence, the Sun may be approximated as an immovable center of force, reducing the problem to the motion of Mercury in response to the force applied by the Sun.  In reality, however, the Sun also moves (albeit only slightly) in response to the force applied by the planet Mercury.

Such approximations are unnecessary, however.  Newton's laws of motion allow any classical two-body problem to be converted into a corresponding exact one-body problem.  To demonstrate this, let x1 and x2 be the positions of the two particles, and let r = x1 − x2 be their relative position.  Then, by Newton's second law,

The final equation derives from Newton's third law; the force of the second body on the first body (F21) is equal and opposite to the force of the first body on the second (F12).  Thus, the equation of motion for r can be written in the form

where  is the reduced mass

As a special case, the problem of two bodies interacting by a central force can be reduced to a central-force problem of one body.

Qualitative properties

Planar motion

The motion of a particle under a central force F always remains in the plane defined by its initial position and velocity. This may be seen by symmetry.  Since the position r, velocity v and force F all lie in the same plane, there is never an acceleration perpendicular to that plane, because that would break the symmetry between "above" the plane and "below" the plane. 

To demonstrate this mathematically, it suffices to show that the angular momentum of the particle is constant.  This angular momentum L is defined by the equation

where m is the mass of the particle and p is its linear momentum.  Therefore, the angular momentum vector L is always perpendicular to the plane defined by the particle's position vector r and velocity vector v.

In general, the rate of change of the angular momentum L equals the net torque r × F

The first term m v × v is always zero, because the vector cross product is always zero for any two vectors pointing in the same or opposite directions.  However, when F is a central force, the remaining term r × F is also zero because the vectors r and F point in the same or opposite directions.  Therefore, the angular momentum vector L is constant. Then

Consequently, the particle's position r (and hence velocity v) always lies in a plane perpendicular to L.

Polar coordinates

Since the motion is planar and the force radial, it is customary to switch to polar coordinates.  In these coordinates, the position vector r is represented in terms of the radial distance r and the azimuthal angle φ.

Taking the first derivative with respect to time yields the particle's velocity vector v

Similarly, the second derivative of the particle's position r equals its acceleration a

The velocity v and acceleration a can be expressed in terms of the radial and azimuthal unit vectors.  The radial unit vector is obtained by dividing the position vector r by its magnitude r, as described above

The azimuthal unit vector is given by

Thus, the velocity can be written as

whereas the acceleration equals

Specific angular momentum

Since F = ma by Newton's second law of motion and since F is a central force, then only the radial component of the acceleration a can be non-zero; the angular component aφ must be zero

Therefore,

This expression in parentheses is usually denoted h

which equals the speed v times r⊥, the component of the radius vector perpendicular to the velocity.  h is the magnitude of the specific angular momentum because it equals the magnitude L of the angular momentum divided by the mass m of the particle.

For brevity, the angular speed is sometimes written ω

However, it should not be assumed that ω is constant.  Since h is constant, ω varies with the radius r according to the formula

Since h is constant and r2 is positive, the angle φ changes monotonically in any central-force problem, either continuously increasing (h positive) or continuously decreasing (h negative).

Constant areal velocity

The magnitude of h also equals twice the areal velocity, which is the rate at which area is being swept out by the particle relative to the center.  Thus, the areal velocity is constant for a particle acted upon by any type of central force; this is Kepler's second law.  Conversely, if the motion under a conservative force F is planar and has constant areal velocity for all initial conditions of the radius r and velocity v, then the azimuthal acceleration aφ is always zero.  Hence, by Newton's second law, F = ma, the force is a central force.

The constancy of areal velocity may be illustrated by uniform circular and linear motion.  In uniform circular motion, the particle moves with constant speed v around the circumference of a circle of radius r.  Since the angular velocity ω = v/r is constant, the area swept out in a time Δt equals ω r2Δt; hence, equal areas are swept out in equal times Δt.  In uniform linear motion (i.e., motion in the absence of a force, by Newton's first law of motion), the particle moves with constant velocity, that is, with constant speed v along a line.  In a time Δt, the particle sweeps out an area vΔtr⊥ (the impact parameter).  The distance r⊥ does not change as the particle moves along the line; it represents the distance of closest approach of the line to the center O (the impact parameter).  Since the speed v is likewise unchanging, the areal velocity vr⊥ is a constant of motion; the particle sweeps out equal areas in equal times.

Equivalent parallel force field

By a transformation of variables, any central-force problem can be converted into an equivalent parallel-force problem.  In place of the ordinary x and y Cartesian coordinates, two new position variables ξ = x/y and η = 1/y are defined, as is a new time coordinate τ

The corresponding equations of motion for ξ and η are given by

Since the rate of change of ξ is constant, its second derivative is zero

Since this is the acceleration in the ξ direction and since F=ma by Newton's second law, it follows that the force in the ξ direction is zero.  Hence the force is only along the η direction, which is the criterion for a parallel-force problem.  Explicitly, the acceleration in the η direction equals

because the acceleration in the y-direction equals

Here, Fy denotes the y-component of the central force, and y/r equals the cosine of the angle between the y-axis and the radial vector r.

General solution

Binet equation

Since a central force F acts only along the radius, only the radial component of the acceleration is nonzero.  By Newton's second law of motion, the magnitude of F equals the mass m of the particle times the magnitude of its radial  acceleration

This equation has integration factor 

Integrating yields

If h is not zero, the independent variable can be changed from t to ϕ

giving the new equation of motion

Making the change of variables to the inverse radius u = 1/r yields

where C is a constant of integration and the function G(u) is defined by

This equation becomes quasilinear on differentiating by ϕ

This is known as the Binet equation.  Integrating  yields the solution for ϕ

where ϕ0 is another constant of integration.  A central-force problem is said to be "integrable" if this final integration can be solved in terms of known functions.

Orbit of the particle
The total energy of the system Etot equals the sum of the potential energy and the kinetic energy

Since the total energy is constant, the rate of change of r can be calculated

which may be converted (as before) to the derivative of r with respect to the azimuthal angle φ

Integrating and using the angular-momentum formula L=mh yields the formula

which indicates that the angular momentum contributes an effective potential energy

Changing the variable of integration to the inverse radius yields the integral

which expresses the above constants C = 2mEtot/L2 and G(u) = 2mU(1/u)/L2 above in terms of the total energy Etot and the potential energy U(r).

Turning points and closed orbits

The rate of change of r is zero whenever the effective potential energy equals the total energy

The points where this equation is satisfied are known as turning points.  The orbit on either side of a turning point is symmetrical; in other words, if the azimuthal angle is defined such that φ = 0 at the turning point, then the orbit is the same in opposite directions, r(φ) = r(−φ).

If there are two turning points such that the radius r is bounded between rmin and rmax, then the motion is contained within an annulus of those radii.  As the radius varies from the one turning point to the other, the change in azimuthal angle φ equals

The orbit will close upon itself  provided that Δφ equals a rational fraction of 2π, i.e.,

where m and n are integers.  In that case, the radius oscillates exactly m times while the azimuthal angle φ makes exactly n revolutions.  In general, however, Δφ/2π will not be such a rational number, and thus the orbit will not be closed.  In that case, the particle will eventually pass arbitrarily close to every point within the annulus.  Two types of central force always produce closed orbits: F(r) = αr (a linear force) and F(r) = α/r2 (an inverse-square law).  As shown by Bertrand, these two central forces are the only ones that guarantee closed orbits.

In general, if the angular momentum L is nonzero, the L2/2mr2 term prevents the particle from falling into the origin, unless the effective potential energy goes to negative infinity in the limit of r going to zero.  Therefore, if there is a single turning point, the orbit generally goes to infinity; the turning point corresponds to a point of minimum radius.

Specific solutions

Kepler problem

In classical physics, many important forces follow an inverse-square law, such as gravity or electrostatics.  The general mathematical form of such inverse-square central forces is

for a constant , which is negative for an attractive force and positive for a repulsive one.

This special case of the classical central-force problem is called the Kepler problem.  For an inverse-square force, the Binet equation derived above is linear

The solution of this equation is

which shows that the orbit is a conic section of eccentricity e; here, φ0 is the initial angle, and the center of force is at the focus of the conic section.  Using the half-angle formula for sine, this solution can also be written as

where u1 and u2 are constants, with u2 larger than u1.  The two versions of the solution are related by the equations

and

Since the sin2 function is always greater than zero, u2 is the largest possible value of u and the inverse of the smallest possible value of r, i.e., the distance of closest approach (periapsis).  Since the radial distance r cannot be a negative number, neither can its inverse u; therefore, u2 must be a positive number.  If u1 is also positive, it is the smallest possible value of u, which corresponds to the largest possible value of r, the distance of furthest approach (apoapsis).  If u1 is zero or negative, then the smallest possible value of u is zero (the orbit goes to infinity); in this case, the only relevant values of φ are those that make u positive.

For an attractive force (α < 0), the orbit is an ellipse, a hyperbola or parabola, depending on whether u1 is positive, negative, or zero, respectively; this corresponds to an eccentricity e less than one, greater than one, or equal to one.  For a repulsive force (α > 0), u1 must be negative, since u2 is positive by definition and their sum is negative; hence, the orbit is a hyperbola.  Naturally, if no force is present (α=0), the orbit is a straight line.

Central forces with exact solutions

The Binet equation for u(φ) can be solved numerically for nearly any central force F(1/u).  However, only a handful of forces result in formulae for u in terms of known functions.  As derived above, the solution for φ can be expressed as an integral over u

A central-force problem is said to be "integrable" if this integration can be solved in terms of known functions.

If the force is a power law, i.e., if F(r) = α rn, then u can be expressed in terms of circular functions and/or elliptic functions if n equals 1, -2, -3 (circular functions) and -7, -5, -4, 0, 3, 5, -3/2, -5/2, -1/3, -5/3 and -7/3 (elliptic functions).  Similarly, only six possible linear combinations of power laws give solutions in terms of circular and elliptic functions

The following special cases of the first two force types always result in circular functions.

The special case  was mentioned by Newton, in corollary 1 to proposition VII of the principia, as the force implied by circular orbits passing through the point of attraction.

Revolving orbits

The term r−3 occurs in all the force laws above, indicating that the addition of the inverse-cube force does not influence the solubility of the problem in terms of known functions.  Newton showed that, with adjustments in the initial conditions, the addition of such a force does not affect the radial motion of the particle, but multiplies its angular motion by a constant factor k.  An extension of Newton's theorem was discovered in 2000 by Mahomed and Vawda.

Assume that a particle is moving under an arbitrary central force F1(r), and let its radius r and azimuthal angle φ be denoted as r(t) and φ1(t) as a function of time t.  Now consider a second particle with the same mass m that shares the same radial motion r(t), but one whose angular speed is k times faster than that of the first particle. In other words, the azimuthal angles of the two particles are related by the equation φ2(t) = k φ1(t). Newton showed that the force acting on the second particle equals the force F1(r) acting on the first particle, plus an inverse-cube central force

where L1 is the magnitude of the first particle's angular momentum.

If k2 is greater than one, F2−F1 is a negative number; thus, the added inverse-cube force is attractive. Conversely, if k2 is less than one, F2−F1 is a positive number; the added inverse-cube force is repulsive.

Historical development

Newton's derivation
The classical central-force problem was solved geometrically by Isaac Newton in his Philosophiæ Naturalis Principia Mathematica, in which Newton introduced his laws of motion.  Newton used an equivalent of leapfrog integration to convert the continuous motion to a discrete one, so that geometrical methods may be applied.  In this approach, the position of the particle is considered only at evenly spaced time points.  For illustration, the particle in Figure 10 is located at point A at time t = 0, at point B at time t = Δt, at point C at time t = 2Δt, and so on for all times t = nΔt, where n is an integer.  The velocity is assumed to be constant between these time points.  Thus, the vector rAB = rB − rA equals Δt times the velocity vector vAB (red line), whereas rBC = rC − rB equals vBCΔt (blue line).    Since the velocity is constant between points, the force is assumed to act instantaneously at each new position; for example, the force acting on the particle at point B instantly changes the velocity from vAB to vBC.  The difference vector Δr = rBC − rAB equals ΔvΔt (green line), where Δv = vBC − vAB is the change in velocity resulting from the force at point B.  Since the acceleration a is parallel to Δv and since F = ma, the force F must be parallel to Δv and Δr.  If F is a central force, it must be parallel to the vector rB from the center O to the point B (dashed green line); in that case, Δr is also parallel to rB.

If no force acts at point B, the velocity is unchanged, and the particle arrives at point K at time t = 2Δt.  The areas of the triangles OAB and OBK are equal, because they share the same base (rAB) and height (r⊥).  If Δr is parallel to rB, the triangles OBK and OBC are likewise equal, because they share the same base (rB) and the height is unchanged.  In that case, the areas of the triangles OAB and OBC are the same, and the particle sweeps out equal areas in equal time.  Conversely, if the areas of all such triangles are equal, then Δr must be parallel to rB, from which it follows that F is a central force.  Thus, a particle sweeps out equal areas in equal times if and only if F is a central force.

Alternative derivations of the equations of motion

Lagrangian mechanics

The formula for the radial force may also be obtained using Lagrangian mechanics.  In polar coordinates, the Lagrangian L of a single particle in a potential energy field U(r) is given by

Then Lagrange's equations of motion

take the form

since the magnitude F(r) of the radial force equals the negative derivative of the potential energy U(r) in the radial direction.

Hamiltonian mechanics

The radial force formula may also be derived using Hamiltonian mechanics.  In polar coordinates, the Hamiltonian can be written as

Since the azimuthal angle φ does not appear in the Hamiltonian, its conjugate momentum pφ is a constant of the motion. This conjugate momentum is the magnitude L of the angular momentum, as shown by the Hamiltonian equation of motion for φ

The corresponding equation of motion for r is

Taking the second derivative of r with respect to time and using Hamilton's equation of motion for pr yields the radial-force equation

Hamilton-Jacobi equation
The orbital equation can be derived directly from the Hamilton–Jacobi equation.  Adopting the radial distance r and the azimuthal angle φ as the coordinates, the Hamilton-Jacobi equation for a central-force problem can be written

where S = Sφ(φ) + Sr(r) − Etott is Hamilton's principal function, and Etot and t represent the total energy and time, respectively.  This equation may be solved by successive integrations of ordinary differential equations, beginning with the φ equation

where pφ is a constant of the motion equal to the magnitude of the angular momentum L.  Thus, Sφ(φ) = Lφ and the Hamilton–Jacobi equation becomes

Integrating this equation for Sr yields

Taking the derivative of S with respect to L yields the orbital equation derived above

See also

 Schwarzschild geodesics, the analog in general relativity
 Particle in a spherically symmetric potential, the analog in quantum mechanics
 Hydrogen-like atom, the Kepler problem in quantum mechanics
 Inverse square potential

Notes

References

Bibliography

External links
 Two-body Central Force Problems by D. E. Gary of the New Jersey Institute of Technology
 Motion in a Central-Force Field by A. Brizard of Saint Michael's College
 Motion under the Influence of a Central Force by G. W. Collins, II of Case Western Reserve University
 Video lecture by W. H. G. Lewin of the Massachusetts Institute of Technology

Classical mechanics
Articles containing video clips